Ooty varkey is a type of biscuit food, made out of wheat flour, rice, semolina, water, ghee, sugar and salt. It can be either deep fried or baked. It is considered a local colonial era re-interpretation of the French puff pastry.

History 
Since the colonial rule, Ooty is famous for its Varkey. No one knows how or when it came in to existence or how it came to be called Varkey.

Efforts on GI (Geographical Indication) certification recognition
The president of Ooty Bakery Owners Association informed that if they are given GI certification it will be a boon to the bakers in Ooty. They obtain the raw materials domestically. The properties of the water and weather in Ooty gives Varkey a distinct taste.

No Animal Fat
Ooty Varkey does not contain animal fat. There are more than 90 Varkey manufacturers in Ooty and none of them use animal fat in its production is what the president of Ooty Bakery owners Association claims.

References

Cookies
Biscuits
Indian snack foods
Ooty
Semolina dishes